Giacomo Berlato (born 5 February 1992) is an Italian professional racing cyclist, who last rode in mountain biking for Italian amateur team Bike Innovation Focus Rosti. In road racing, Berlato was named in the start list for the 2016 Giro d'Italia.

Major results

2010
 3rd Overall Giro della Lunigiana
1st Stage 2
2013
 5th Giro del Medio Brenta
2014
 1st Trofeo Città di San Vendemiano
 1st Ruota d'Oro
 9th Trofeo Banca Popolare di Vicenza
2016
 4th Overall Tour de Korea
 8th Overall Sibiu Cycling Tour
2017
 4th Overall Tour de Hokkaido

Grand Tour general classification results timeline

References

External links

1992 births
Living people
Italian male cyclists
Cyclists from the Province of Vicenza
People from Schio